Balantrapu may refer to:

 Balantrapu Rajanikanta Rao (1920–2018), writer, composer and poet in the Telugu language
 Balantrapu Venkata Rao, one of the two Telugu poets in the duo Venkata Parvatiswara Kavulu